Cielo is a Canadian-Chilean documentary film, directed by Alison McAlpine and released in 2017. Filmed in the Atacama Desert in Chile, Cielo investigates the many ways we are connected to the stars, planets and everything that extends beyond. In this desert famous for stargazing, we encounter disparate Chileans who live in this area and astronomers who operate giant telescopes, each of whom offers a unique perspective on our relationship to the night sky.

The film premiered at the New York Film Festival in October 2017 and was released in its final version, and commercially, in 2018. Cielo has been presented at well over 300 international festivals and cinemas including Karlovy Vary IFF in Official Competition; Hot Docs in Official Competition; Film Forum, New York City; TIFF Bell Lightbox Toronto; Ahrya Fine Arts by Laemle, LA; Filmhouse Edinburgh; and Cinema du Parc Montreal.

Reception
Cielo was named as "one of the 10 best documentaries of 2018" by Esquire, while The Guardianincluded it on its list of "the best films of 2018… that you didn't see." Cielo has received critical acclaim by publications such as Variety, The Village Voice, The Globe and Mail, American Cinematographer, RogerEbert.com, Le Devoir, NOW, among others.

Filmmaker Walter Murch described it as "a beautiful film!! Photography, sound, structure, subject matter-enough to lift the spirits out of any earthly trough. A moving film in all senses of the word."

Awards and Nominations
 2018: American Cinematographer Award, Salem Film Fest, US
 2018: Premio Kinêma, SANFIC, Chile
 2019: Best Cinematography, Byron Bay International Film Festival, Australia
 2018: Creative Excellence Award, Banff Mountain Film Festival, Canada
 2019: Audience Award, Best Full-Length Film, Trento Film Festival, Italy
 2019: Best Director, Patagonia Eco Film Fest, Argentina
 2019: Best Cinematography, BBK Mendi Film Bilbao, Spain
 2019: Four Prix Iris nominations at the 21st Quebec Cinema Awards in 2019, for Best Documentary Film, Best Cinematography in a Documentary (Benjamin Echazarreta), Best Sound in a Documentary (McAlpine, Andrés Carrasco, Miguel Hormazábal, Mauricio López, Rodrigo Salvatierra, Carlo Sanchez Farías and Claudio Vargas) and Most Successful Film Outside Quebec.

References

External links

Official Website

2017 films
Canadian documentary films
Chilean documentary films
Quebec films
2010s Canadian films